Epena is a district in the Likouala Region of north-eastern Republic of the Congo. The capital lies at Epena.

Towns and villages
Epena

See also
Lake Tele
Lake Mboukou

References

Likouala Department
Districts of the Republic of the Congo